De Glind is a village near Barneveld in the middle of Netherlands, in the province Gelderland.

History 
It was first mentioned in 1321 as Ghelinde, and means "fenced off terrain". The havezate Glinthorst was mentioned for the first time in 1325. It was demolished around 1780. In 1840, it was home to 498 people. In 1916, a church was built in De Glind.

Farmers could rent a piece of land, but were obliged to take care of children. The youth village still exists, and is nowadays operated by the Rudolph Foundation.

Gallery

References

External links 
De Glind Digitaal Website

Populated places in Gelderland
Barneveld (municipality)